The 2021–22 Iran Super League season was the 32nd season of the Iranian basketball league.

Regular season

Group A

Group B

Second round

Group C

Group D

Group E

Group F

Standings

Group A

Group B

Playoffs

 The 3rd place playoff game between Nazmavaran Sirjan and Chemidor Qom, initially scheduled for 26 April, was canceled by mutual agreement. The two teams shared the 3rd place.

1/8 finals

|}

Quarterfinals 

|}

Semifinals 

|}

Final 

|}

Imports
The following is the list of imports, which had played for their respective teams at least once, with the returning imports in italics.

References

 Asia Basket
 Iranian Basketball Federation

Iranian Basketball Super League seasons
Iran